Henriette Major (January 6, 1933 – November 17, 2006) was a Canadian writer living in Quebec.

She was born in Montreal and studied at the Institut pédagogique de Montréal. However, she soon discovered that she did not want to be a teacher. After becoming a mother, she  began writing down stories that she told to her children so that she would remember them. She tried other occupations, including working as a researcher for radio and television, but finally decided to make a career of writing. She published almost a thousand articles for various magazines, including Châtelaine and Maclean's, and about a hundred children's books in Quebec and France. In 1978, her television series  received the Prix des émissions éducatives. Major also published several collections of songs: Chansons et rondes pour s'amuser, Chansons drôles, chansons folles, Chansons douces, chansons tendres and Le Tour du monde en chansons).

She died suddenly at home in Montreal at the age of 73.

The Prix littéraire Henriette-Major was created in her honour by the publishing house Dominique et Compagnie.

Selected works 
 La surprise de dame Chenille (1970), received a prize from the Canadian Library Association in 1971
 Les contes de Nulle part et d’Ailleurs (1975) 
 L'Évangile en papier (1978), received the 
 François d’Assise (1981), about Saint Francis of Assisi
 Marguerite Bourgeoys (1983)
 La machine à rêves (1984)
 Les devinettes d'Henriette (2004), received the Prix Québec-Wallonie-Bruxelles
 Jongleries (2006), illustrations by Philippe Béha

References

External links 
 
  Fonds Henriette Major (R12806) at Library and Archives Canada

1933 births
2006 deaths
Canadian children's writers
Writers from Montreal
Canadian writers in French
Canadian women children's writers
Canadian television writers
Canadian women television writers
20th-century Canadian screenwriters
20th-century Canadian women writers